The men's decathlon event at the 2005 European Athletics U23 Championships was held in Erfurt, Germany, at Steigerwaldstadion on 14 and 15 July.

Medalists

Results

Final
14–15 July

Participation
According to an unofficial count, 23 athletes from 13 countries participated in the event.

 (1)
 (1)
 (2)
 (3)
 (3)
 (1)
 (2)
 (1)
 (2)
 (2)
 (2)
 (2)
 (1)

References

Decathlon
Combined events at the European Athletics U23 Championships